Sanicula is a genus of plants in family Apiaceae (or Umbelliferae), the same family to which the carrot and parsnip belong.  This genus has about 45 species worldwide, with at least 22 in North America.  The common names usually include the terms sanicle or black snakeroot.

Etymology
Sanicula comes from sanus, Latin for "healthy", reflecting the use of S. europaea in traditional remedies.

List of species
, Plants of the World Online accepted the following species:
Sanicula arctopoides Hook. & Arn.
Sanicula arguta Greene ex J.M.Coult. & Rose
Sanicula astrantiifolia H.Wolff ex Kretschmer
Sanicula azorica Guthnick ex Seub.
Sanicula bipinnata Hook. & Arn.
Sanicula bipinnatifida Douglas
Sanicula canadensis L.
Sanicula chinensis Bunge
Sanicula coerulescens Franch.
Sanicula crassicaulis Poepp. ex DC.
Sanicula deserticola C.R.Bell
Sanicula elata Buch.-Ham. ex D.Don
Sanicula elongata K.T.Fu
Sanicula epipactis (Scop.) E.H.L.Krause
Sanicula europaea L.
Sanicula giraldii H.Wolff
Sanicula graveolens Poepp. ex DC.
Sanicula hacquetioides Franch.
Sanicula hoffmannii (Munz) R.H.Shan & Constance
Sanicula kaiensis Makino & Hisauti
Sanicula kauaiensis H.St.John
Sanicula laciniata Hook. & Arn.
Sanicula lamelligera Hance
Sanicula liberta Cham. & Schltdl.
Sanicula marilandica L.
Sanicula maritima Kellogg ex S.Watson
Sanicula mariversa Nagata & S.M.Gon
Sanicula moranii P.Vargas, Constance & B.G.Baldwin
Sanicula odorata (Raf.) Pryer & Phillippe
Sanicula orthacantha S.Moore
Sanicula oviformis X.T.Liu & Z.Y.Liu
Sanicula peckiana J.F.Macbr.
Sanicula purpurea H.St.John & Hosaka
Sanicula rubriflora F.Schmidt
Sanicula rugulosa Diels
Sanicula sandwicensis A.Gray
Sanicula saxatilis Greene
Sanicula serrata H.Wolff
Sanicula smallii E.P.Bicknell
Sanicula tienmuensis R.H.Shan & Constance
Sanicula tracyi R.H.Shan & Constance
Sanicula trifoliata E.P.Bicknell
Sanicula tuberculata Maxim.
Sanicula tuberosa Torr.
Sanicula uralensis Kleopow ex Kamelin, Czubarov & Shmakov

References

External links
  UC CalPhotos gallery of Sanicula species
  CalFlora Database:  Sanicula species native to California 
 Zipcodezoo.com: Sanicula photos + taxonomy — with distribution map link. 

 
Apioideae genera
Flora of North America
Negligibly senescent organisms
Taxa named by Carl Linnaeus